The Surprise 15 is an American sailboat that was designed by Harry R. Sindle as a daysailer and first built in 1969.

The Surprise 15 is a development of the Skipjack 15.

Production
The design was built by Newport Boats in Newport, California, United States, starting in 1969, but it is now out of production.

Design
The Surprise 15 is a recreational keelboat, built predominantly of fiberglass, with wood trim. It has a fractional sloop rig, a plumb stem and transom, a transom-hung rudder controlled by a tiller and a retractable centerboard. It displaces .

See also
List of sailing boat types

References

Dinghies
1960s sailboat type designs
Sailboat types built in the United States
Sailboat type designs by Harry R. Sindle
Sailboat types built by Newport Boats